Guillaume Tranchant (born 20 February 1980), better known by his stage name Gringe, is a French rapper, songwriter and actor. He is one half of the French hip hop duo Casseurs Flowters, along with Orelsan, with whom he has released two studio albums: Orelsan et Gringe sont les Casseurs Flowters in 2013, and the original soundtrack for their 2015 film Comment c'est loin.

Career
In 2004, Gringe formed the hip hop duo Casseurs Flowters with his colleague Orelsan, and with help from French record producer Skread, they released their first mixtape Fantasy: Episode 1 in 2004 with 11 tracks. Afterwards, the two decided to focus on building their solo careers; Gringe collaborated with a number of artists including El Matador, Brasco, Pit Baccardi, La Province, Jamal and Nubi, while he also appeared on the song "Ils sont cools", from Orelsan's second studio album Le chant des sirènes, which peaked at number 66 on the French (SNEP) Singles Chart.

On 3 July 2013, Gringe released his first collaborative single as Casseurs Flowters with Orelsan, "Bloqué", as a pre-release for their upcoming debut studio album, Orelsan et Gringe sont les Casseurs Flowters, which was released on 15 November 2013 to generally positive reviews. On 9 December 2015, Orelsan and Gringe released their second collective studio album Comment c'est loin, which also served as the soundtrack for their comedy film of the same name, peaking at number 24 on the French Albums Chart and earning a platinum certification in France 13 months later.

In April 2017, Gringe announced that he was working on his debut solo album, but did not provide any exact date for its release.

On 3 November 2018, Gringe released his first solo album Enfant lune.

Discography
Refer also to Casseurs Flowters discography

Solo

Albums

Singles

Other charted songs

Featured in

Filmography
Cinema
2015: Comment c'est loin directed by Orelsan and himself : himself
2017: Carbone directed by Olivier Marchal : Simon Wizman
2018: Les Chatouilles directed by Andréa Bescond : Manu
2019: L'Heure de la sortiedirected by Sébastien Marnier : Steve
2019: Damien veut changer le mondedirected by Xavier de Choudens: Rudy

Television
2015–2016: Bloqués (TV series) in le Petit Journal of Canal + – as himself
2016–2017: Serge le Mytho (TV series, 5 episodes) in le Grand and le Gros Journal on Canal + – as himself

References

External links
 
 
 

1980 births
Living people
People from Val-d'Oise
Casseurs Flowters
French male singers
French rappers
French songwriters
Male songwriters